Gay Hill, Texas may refer to following ghost towns:

Gay Hill, Washington County, Texas
Gay Hill, Fayette County, Texas, in Fayette County, Texas, six miles southeast of La Grange, Texas
Gay Hill, Milam County, Texas, in Milam County, Texas, seven miles away from Rockdale, Texas